The 2019 Natinonale 1 season was the season of the Nationale 1, the premier basketball league in Senegal. 

AS Douanes won its ninth national title on 21 October 2019, beating DUC Dakar in the final. AS Douanes qualified for the 2020 BAL season.

Teams

Regular season

Championship playoffs

References

Nationale 1 (Senegal)
Senegal